Marian Muriel Whiting (1881 – 1978) was a British horticulturalist and plant collector, notable for collecting plants from Hong Kong and Guangzhou. She was born in London and spent a portion of her childhood in Hong Kong before studying at London University. Over 600 of her specimens were donated to the Kew Botanical Gardens.  In 1940, she became a Fellow of the Linnean Society of London, and volunteered at Kew for many years.

Works

References 

1881 births
1978 deaths
20th-century British botanists
20th-century British women scientists